Grič may refer to: 

In Bosnia and Herzegovina:
, a settlement in the municipality of Kotor Varoš
Grič, Donji Vakuf, a settlement in the Municipality of Donji Vakuf

In Croatia:
Grič, Zagreb, a part of Zagreb
Grič, Zagreb County, a village in the municipality of Žumberak
Grič Tunnel (disambiguation), multiple tunnels

In Slovenia:
Beli Grič, a settlement in the Municipality of Mokronog–Trebelno
Drenov Grič, a settlement in the Municipality of Vrhnika
Grič, Kostanjevica na Krki, a settlement in the Municipality of Kostanjevica na Krki
Grič pri Dobličah, a settlement in the Municipality of Črnomelj
Grič pri Klevevžu, a settlement in the Municipality of Šmarješke Toplice
Grič pri Trebnjem, a settlement in the Municipality of Trebnje
Grič, Ribnica, a settlement in the Municipality of Ribnica
Jerinov Grič, a settlement in the Municipality of Vrhnika
Starološki Grič, a settlement in the Municipality of Semič
Trčkov Grič, a settlement in the Municipality of Vrhnika

See also
Gric (disambiguation)